The 2013 Kangaroo Cup was a professional tennis tournament played on outdoor hard courts. It was the seventeenth edition of the tournament which was part of the 2013 ITF Women's Circuit, offering a total of $50,000 in prize money. It took place in Gifu, Japan, on 29 April – 5 May 2013.

WTA entrants

Seeds 

 1 Rankings as of 22 April 2013

Other entrants 
The following players received wildcards into the singles main draw:
  Yurika Aoki
  Hiroko Kuwata
  Yuika Sano
  Miki Ukai

The following players received entry from the qualifying draw:
  Tetyana Arefyeva
  Hu Yueyue
  An-Sophie Mestach
  Chiaki Okadaue

Champions

Singles 

  An-Sophie Mestach def.  Wang Qiang 1–6, 6–3, 6–0

Doubles 

  Luksika Kumkhum /  Erika Sema def.  Nao Hibino /  Riko Sawayanagi 6–4, 6–3

External links 
 2013 Kangaroo Cup at ITFtennis.com

Kangaroo Cup
Kangaroo Cup
2013 in Japanese tennis